These are the official results of the Men's 400 metres event at the 1995 IAAF World Championships in Gothenburg, Sweden. There were a total number of 51 participating athletes, with two semi-finals, four quarter-finals and seven qualifying heats and the final held on Wednesday 1995-08-09.

Final

Semi-finals
Held on Monday 1995-08-07

Quarterfinals
Held on Sunday 1995-08-06

Qualifying heats
Held on Saturday 1995-08-05

References
 Results

H
400 metres at the World Athletics Championships